Major-General Sir Edward Yewd Brabant,  (31 May 1839 – 13 December 1914) was a British military commander in colonial South Africa.  He served in the 9th Xhosa War (1877–1878), First Matabele War (1893–1894), and other campaigns.  During the Second Boer War (1899–1902), he commanded the Colonial Division in 1900, and the Colonial Defence Force of Cape Colony in 1901.

Early life
Brabant was born in Kinderton Lodge, in Middlewich, Cheshire, the son of John Thomas and Elizabeth Jane Brabant. He was baptised at a week old.

First Matabele War

Captain Brabant oversaw the Ndebele employed by the British South Africa Company forces in Fort Victoria, Matabeleland (now Masvingo, Zimbabwe).  He worked with "Matabele" Benjamin Wilson from Cumberland, who was one of the twelve scouts for Allan Wilson's Victoria Column.  The other column scouts were: Bob Bain (Canadian), Frederick Russell Burnham (American), Jack Carruthers, Art Cummings, Duncan Dollar, Pearl "Pete" Ingram (American), Harry Lloyd, Texas Long, Billy Lynch, Andrew Main, and Billy Reed.

Second Anglo-Boer War
As a Brigadier General of the Eastern Cape troops, his command included: Cape Mounted Riflemen, the 79th Battery, RFA, the Kaffrarian Rifles, the Queenstown Volunteers, part of the 1st Battalion, Royal Scots, and Brabant's Horse. He occupied Jamestown and the Herschel district in February 1900. His units operated round the Queenstown/Dordrecht area and moved north to hold the Jammersburg Drift at Wepener, which they did under appalling rain and cold against a superior Boer force led by Christiaan De Wet.

Brabant's Horse
On 5 November 1899, Brabant raised the Light Horse regiment known as Brabant's Horse. The top strength of the unit was 600, all ranks, including South African colonials, Australians, British, Canadians. The unit saw much action against Boer commandos.
Brabant's Horse was disbanded in Cape Town on 31 December 1901.

In 1901 he was knighted as a Knight Commander of the Order of the Bath (KCB) for his services in South Africa.

Later career
Following the end of the war in May 1902, Brabant visited the UK to take the command of the Cape contingent present in London for the Coronation of King Edward VII and Queen Alexandra, including men of the Cape Mounted Rifles and the Cape Police. He received the honorary rank of major-general on 22 August 1902, and returned to South Africa in the  the following month.

The next year, he served as Commandant-General of the Cape Colonial Forces (1903–1904).

Family
His son, Lieutenant Arthur Edward Brabant, served with the Imperial Light Horse during the Second Boer War.  He was wounded at the Siege of Ladysmith and died two days later on 5 November 1899.

References

 
  by Arthur Conan Doyle, London, Smith, Elder & Co. (1902)

1839 births
1914 deaths
People from Middlewich
19th-century British military personnel
Knights Commander of the Order of the Bath
Companions of the Order of St Michael and St George
People of the First Matabele War
British military personnel of the Second Boer War
British military personnel of the 9th Cape Frontier War
Cape Colony army officers